This is a list of the Spanish Singles number-ones of 1971.

Chart history

See also
1971 in music
List of number-one hits (Spain)

References

1971
Spain Singles
Number-one singles